Vladimir Putin (born 1952) is a Russian politician and former intelligence officer who is the president of Russia.

Putin may also refer to:

Putin (surname), includes a list of people with the name
"Putin" (Randy Newman song), 2016 song
PuTin or Puin, Russian brand of vegetable and mushrooms canned goods

See also

Poutine, food dish